The  was an infantry division in the Imperial Japanese Army. It was created 6 July 1944 in Kanazawa. The nucleus for the formation was the training camps of the 52nd division. It was a triangular division.

Action
The 93rd division was assigned to 36th army upon formation. Initial location of the division headquarters was Gotemba, Shizuoka, although 203rd infantry regiment was placed in northern Chiba Prefecture while 204th infantry regiment was placed in Matsumoto, Nagano.

Later entire division was concentrated in Chiba Prefecture, where it spent the time until surrender of Japan 15 August 1945 building a fortifications without engaging in actual combat.

References and further reading

 List of Japanese Infantry Divisions
 Madej, W. Victor. Japanese Armed Forces Order of Battle, 1937-1945 [2 vols] Allentown, PA: 1981
This article incorporates material from the article 第93師団 (日本軍) in the Japanese Wikipedia, retrieved on 24 June 2016.

Japanese World War II divisions
Infantry divisions of Japan
Military units and formations established in 1944
Military units and formations disestablished in 1945
1944 establishments in Japan
1945 disestablishments in Japan